Denise Rosemonde "Rosine" Delamare (11 June 1911 – 17 March 2013) was a French costume designer. She was co-nominated for an Academy Award for her work on the film The Earrings of Madame de… (1953).

Filmography

Cinema 

1942 : The Blue Veil by Jean Stelli
1942 : La Symphonie fantastique by Christian-Jaque
1943 : The Heart of a Nation by Julien Duvivier
1943 : Pierre et Jean by André Cayatte
1943 : The Count of Monte Cristo by Robert Vernay
1943 : Shop Girls of Paris by André Cayatte
1945 : Boule de suif by Christian-Jaque
1946 : Strange Fate by Louis Cuny
1946 : The Revenge of Roger by André Cayatte
1947 : Monsieur Vincent by Maurice Cloche
1947 : Le Destin exécrable de Guillemette Babin by Guillaume Radot
1947 : Captain Blomet by Andrée Feix
1949 : Le Roi by Marc-Gilbert Sauvajon
1949 : Doctor Laennec by Maurice Cloche
1949 : Les amants de Vérone by André Cayatte
1950 : My Friend Sainfoin by Marc-Gilbert Sauvajon
1950 : Cartouche, King of Paris by Guillaume Radot
1950 :  by André Haguet
1950 : Ma pomme by Marc-Gilbert Sauvajon
1951 : Monsieur Fabre by Henri Diamant-Berger
1951 : Captain Ardant by André Zwoboda
1951 : Dr. Knock by Guy Lefranc
1951 : La Maison Bonnadieu by Carlo Rim
1952 : An Artist with Ladies by Jean Boyer
1952 : Adorable Creatures by Christian-Jaque
1952 : The Green Glove by Rudolph Maté
1952 : Plaisirs de Paris by Ralph Baum
1952 : Beauties of the Night by René Clair
1952 : Il est minuit, Docteur Schweitzer by André Haguet
1952 : Judgement of God by Raymond Bernard
1953 : The Earrings of Madame de… by Max Ophüls
1953 : Tourbillon by Alfred Rode
1953 : The Porter from Maxim's by Henri Diamant-Berger
1953 : Dortoir des grandes by Henri Decoin
1953 :  by Raymond Bernard
1953 : The Slave by Yves Ciampi
1953 : The Most Wanted Man by Henri Verneuil
1954 : The Bed, film à sketches, segment Le Lit de la Pompadour by Jean Delannoy
1954 : Les Révoltés de Lomanach by Richard Pottier
1954 : French Cancan by Jean Renoir
1954 : Obsession by Jean Delannoy
1954 : The Red and the Black by Claude Autant-Lara
1954 : Par ordre du tsar by André Haguet
1954 : Scènes de ménage by André Berthomieu
1954 : Le Chevalier de la nuit by Robert Darène
1954 : La Reine Margot by Jean Dréville
1954 : On Trial by Julien Duvivier
1955 : The Grand Maneuver by René Clair
1955 : Les Hussards by Alex Joffé
1955 : Caroline and the Rebels by Jean Devaivre
1955 : Marguerite de la nuit by Claude Autant-Lara
1955 : Black Dossier by André Cayatte
1955 : Rififi by Jules Dassin
1955 : Milord l'Arsouille by André Haguet
1956 : Elena and Her Men de Jean Renoir
1956 : Bonsoir Paris, bonjour l'amour by Ralph Baum
1956 : Les Aventures de Till L'Espiègle by Gérard Philipe and Joris Ivens
1956 : C'est arrivé à Aden by Michel Boisrond
1956 : Meeting in Paris by Georges Lampin
1957 : Gates of Paris by René Clair
1957 : The Man in the Raincoat by Julien Duvivier
1958 : The Roots of Heaven by John Huston
1958 : Thérèse Étienne by Denys de la Patellière
1958 : Maxime by Henri Verneuil
1958 : The Gambler by Claude Autant-Lara
1958 : La Bonne Tisane by Hervé Bromberger
1958 : Christine by Pierre Gaspard-Huit
1959 : La Belle et le Tzigane by Jean Dréville and Márton Keleti
1959 : Magnificent Sinner by Robert Siodmak
1959 : Come Dance with Me by Michel Boisrond
1959 : The Green Mare by Claude Autant-Lara
1960 : Le secret du Chevalier d'Éon by Jacqueline Audry
1961 : The Three Musketeers by Bernard Borderie
1961 : Vive Henri IV, vive l'amour by Claude Autant-Lara
1961 : The Wonders of Aladdin (Le meraviglie di Aladino) by Mario Bava and Henry Levin
1961 : The Count of Monte Cristo by Claude Autant-Lara
1962 : Mandrin by Jean-Paul Le Chanois
1962 : Le Chevalier de Pardaillan by Bernard Borderie
1962 : Cartouche by Philippe de Broca
1964 : Angélique, Marquise des Anges by Bernard Borderie
1965 : Marvelous Angelique by Bernard Borderie
1966 : Angelique and the King by Bernard Borderie
1967 : Un idiot à Paris by Serge Korber
1967 : The Night of the Generals by Anatole Litvak
1967 : Untamable Angelique by Bernard Borderie
1967 : La Vingt-cinquième Heure by Henri Verneuil
1968 : Emma Hamilton by Christian-Jaque
1968 : Angelique and the Sultan by Bernard Borderie
1969 : The Madwoman of Chaillot by Bryan Forbes
1969 :  by Bernard Borderie
1970 : Rider on the Rain by René Clément
1970 : Hello, Goodbye by Jean Negulesco
1971 : Time for Loving by Christopher Miles
1973 : The Day of the Jackal by Fred Zinnemann
1974 : Piaf by Guy Casaril
1976 : Une femme fidèle by Roger Vadim
1977 : Gloria by Claude Autant-Lara
1979 : A Little Romance by George Roy Hill
1980 : L'Avare by Jean Girault and Louis de Funès
1981 : Chanel Solitaire by George Kaczender
1983 : Benvenuta by André Delvaux
1984 : Fort Saganne by Alain Corneau

Television 
1962 : Le Cid (tragi-comedy by Pierre Corneille), teledrama by Roger Iglésis
1962 : La Fille du capitaine, teledrama by Alain Boudet, for the  series
1963 : Tous ceux qui tombent, teledrama by Michel Mitrani
1974 : Le deuil sied à Électre (trilogie by Eugene O'Neill), directed by Maurice Cazeneuve  
1978 : Jean-Christophe, serial by François Villiers
1980 : Les Mystères de Paris, serial by André Michel
1980 : Gaughin the Savage, telefilm by Fielder Cook
1984 : La Dame aux camélias (Camille), telefilm by Desmond Davis

Theatre 
(selection)
1951 : Le Sabre de mon père by Roger Vitrac, directed by Pierre Dux, with Sophie Desmarets, P. Dux (Théâtre de Paris)
1955 : Les Amants novices by Jean Bernard-Luc, directed by Jean Mercure, with Dany Robin, Claude Rich (Théâtre Montparnasse)
 1976: Doit-on le dire ? by Eugène Labiche, directed by Jean-Laurent Cochet, with Claude Giraud and Jacques Sereys (Comédie-Française)
1979 : A Flea in Her Ear by Georges Feydeau, directed by Jean-Laurent Cochet, with Paule Noëlle, Michel Aumont (Comédie-Française)
1981 : Chéri, after the eponymous novel by Colette, directed by Jean-Laurent Cochet, with Michèle Morgan, Jean-Pierre Bouvier, Odette Laure (Théâtre des Variétés)

Awards and nominations

References

External links 
 

1911 births
2013 deaths
French centenarians
French costume designers
Women costume designers
People from Colombes
Women centenarians